Blyry Lower is a townland in Athlone, County Westmeath, Ireland. The townland is in the civil parish of St. Mary's.

The townland covers the north-eastern area of the town, and contains a large industrial estate. The N55 road forms the northern border. Blyry Upper is to the south of the townland.

References 

Townlands of County Westmeath